The Order of the Eastern Star is a Masonic appendant body open to both men and women. The order is based on some teachings from the Bible, and is open to people of all religious beliefs. It has approximately 10,000 chapters in twenty countries and approximately 500,000 members under its General Grand Chapter.

Members of the Order of the Eastern Star are aged 18 and older; men must be Master Masons and women must have specific relationships with Masons. Originally, a woman would have to be the daughter, widow, wife, sister, or mother of a Master Mason. The Order now allows other relatives as well as allowing  Job's Daughters, Rainbow Girls, Members of the Organization of Triangles (NY only) and members of the Constellation of Junior Stars (NY only) to become members when of age.

History

The Order was created by Rob Morris in 1850 when he was teaching at the Eureka Masonic College in Richland, Mississippi. While confined by illness, he set down the principles of the order in his Rosary of the Eastern Star. By 1855, he had organized a "Supreme Constellation" in New York, which chartered chapters throughout the United States.

In 1866, Dr. Morris started working with Robert Macoy, and handed the Order over to him while Morris was traveling in the Holy Land. Macoy organized the current system of Chapters, and modified Dr. Morris' Rosary into a Ritual.

On December 1, 1874, Queen Esther Chapter No. 1 became the first Prince Hall Affiliate chapter of the Order of the Eastern Star when it was established in Washington, D.C. by Thornton Andrew Jackson.

The "General Grand Chapter" was formed in Indianapolis, Indiana on November 6, 1876. Committees formed at that time created the Ritual of the Order of the Eastern Star in more or less its current form.

Emblem and heroines
The emblem of the Order is a five-pointed star with the white ray of the star pointing downwards towards the manger.  The meaning of the letters FATAL surrounding the center pentagon in the emblem is only revealed to members of the Order. In the Chapter room, the downward-pointing white ray points to the West. The character-building lessons taught in the Order are stories inspired by Biblical figures:
 Adah (Jephthah's daughter, from the Book of Judges). In Eastern Star, Adah is represented by the color blue and a sword and veil.  Adah represents the virtue of obedience to duty.
 Ruth, the widow from the Book of Ruth. In Eastern Star, Ruth is represented by the color yellow and a sheaf of barley.  Ruth represents the virtue of religious principles.
 Esther, the wife from the Book of Esther. In Eastern Star, Esther is represented by the color white and a crown and scepter.  Esther represents the virtue of loyalty.
 Martha, sister of Mary and Lazarus, from the Gospel of Luke and the Gospel of John. In Eastern Star, Martha is represented by the color green and a broken column.  Martha represents the virtue of endurance in trial.
 Electa (the "elect lady" from II John), the mother. In Eastern Star, Electa is represented by the color red and a chalice.  Electa represents the virtue of endurance of persecution.

Officers

There are 18 main officers in a full chapter:

 Worthy Matron – presiding officer
 Worthy Patron – a Master Mason who provides general supervision
 Associate Matron – assumes the duties of the Worthy Matron in the absence of that officer
 Associate Patron – assumes the duties of the Worthy Patron in the absence of that officer
 Secretary – takes care of all correspondence and minutes
 Treasurer – takes care of monies of the Chapter
 Conductress – Leads visitors and initiations.
 Associate Conductress – Prepares candidates for initiation, assists the conductress with introductions and handles the ballot box.
 Chaplain – leads the Chapter in prayer
 Marshal – presents the Flag and leads in all ceremonies
 Organist – provides music for the meetings
 Adah – Shares the lesson of Duty of Obedience to the will of God
 Ruth – Shares the lesson of Honor and Justice
 Esther – Shares the lesson of Loyalty to Family and Friends
 Martha – Shares the lesson of Faith and Trust in God and Everlasting Life
 Electa – Shares the lesson of Charity and Hospitality
 Warder – Sits next to the door inside the meeting room, to make sure those that enter the chapter room are members of the Order.
 Sentinel – Sits next to the door outside the chapter room, to ensure people who wish to enter are members of the Order.

Traditionally, a woman who is elected Associate Conductress will be elected to Conductress the following year, then the next year Associate Matron, and the next year Worthy Matron. A man elected Associate Patron will usually be elected Worthy Patron the following year. Usually the woman who is elected to become Associate Matron will let it be known who she wishes to be her Associate Patron, so the next year they will both go to the East together as Worthy Matron and Worthy Patron. There is no male counterpart to the Conductress and Associate Conductress. Only women are allowed to be Matrons, Conductresses, and the Star Points (Adah, Ruth, etc.) and only men can be Patrons.

Once a member has served a term as Worthy Matron or Worthy Patron, they may use the post-nominal letters, PM or PP respectively.

Headquarters

The General Grand Chapter headquarters, the International Temple, is located in the Dupont Circle neighborhood of Washington, D.C., in the Perry Belmont Mansion. The mansion was built in 1909 for the purpose of entertaining the guests of Perry Belmont. They included Britain's Prince of Wales in 1919. General Grand Chapter purchased the building in 1935. The secretary of General Grand Chapter lives there while serving his or her term of office. The mansion features works of art from around the world, most of which were given as gifts from various international Eastern Star chapters.

Charities
The Order has a charitable foundation and from 1986 to 2001 contributed $513,147 to Alzheimer's disease research, juvenile diabetes research, and juvenile asthma research. It also provides bursaries to students of theology and religious music, as well as other scholarships that differ by jurisdiction. In 2000 over $83,000 was donated.  Many jurisdictions support a Masonic and/or Eastern Star retirement center or nursing home for older members; some homes are also open to the public. The Elizabeth Bentley OES Scholarship Fund was started in 1947.

Notable members

 Kate M. Ainey
 Clara Barton
 Clara Nettie Bates
 Cora M. Beach
 Ollie Josephine Prescott Baird Bennett
 Beatrice Gjertsen Bessesen
 Ella A. Bigelow
 Georgiana M. Blankenship
 Harriet Bossnot
 Emma Eliza Bower
 Gene Bradford
 Ella Frances Braman
 Bernice Cameron
 Edith Daley
 Nannie C. Dunsmoor
 Addie C. Strong Engle
 J. Howell Flournoy
 Laura J. Frakes
 Thora B. Gardiner
 Bertha Lund Glaeser 
 Sabra R. Greenhalgh
 Harriet A. Haas
 Sallie Foster Harshbarger
 Jane Denio Hutchison
 Vernettie O. Ivy
 Kate Wetzel Jameson
 Nannie S. Brown Kramer
 Jeanette Lawrence
 Mab Copland Lineman
 Edith Bolte MacCracken
 Eva McGown
 Rebecca B. Mellors
 Sara E. Morse
 Vesta C. Muehleisen
 Kate Pier 
 Lorraine J. Pitkin
 Grace Gimmini Potts
 Jennie Phelps Purvis
 Lois Randolph
 M. Elizabeth Shellabarger
 Caroline Estes Smith
 James Peyton Smith
 Lura Eugenie Brown Smith
 Lee Emmett Thomas
 Violet Richardson Ward
 Nellie A. White
 Laura Ingalls Wilder

African-American Prince Hall Order of the Eastern Star 

The Prince Hall Order of the Eastern Star is the predominantly African-American equivalent of the Order of the Eastern Star.

See also
 Achoth
 Omega Epsilon Sigma
 Eastern Star Home

References

External links
 
 
 Pride of the North Chapter Number 61, Order of the Eastern Star Archival Collection, located at Shorefront Legacy Center, Evanston, Illinois

 
1850 establishments in the United States
Organizations based in Washington, D.C.
Organizations established in 1850